Bina Junction railway station is a railway junction in Madhya Pradesh that is part of Bhopal division of West Central Railway. Bina Junction serves Bina city along with the surrounding areas of Bundelkhand and Malwa. Its code is BINA. Bina Junction has six platforms.

References

Railway junction stations in Madhya Pradesh
Railway stations in Sagar district
Bhopal railway division